Cheranalloor Raveendranath is an Indian politician and is the former Minister for Education of the Government of Kerala in the first Pinarayi Vijayan Ministry. He is a Communist Party of India (Marxist) politician from Thrissur and the member of the Kerala Legislative Assembly from Puthukkad Assembly constituency since 2011.
He is a retired chemistry professor of St. Thomas College, Thrissur.

He had also worked as the resource person of Total Literacy Programme, consultant to the State Planning Board, district convenor of People's Planning programme.
Officials remember him tapping MLA-MP funds and three-tier panchayats for implementing projects in agriculture, horticulture, floriculture and in dairying.
Some of the projects include ‘Nivedya Kadali' of providing bananas to Guruvayur temple, supplying organic vegetables to Oushadhi, a state government entity producing Ayurvedic medicines, Natural Fresh Milk Scheme for supply in Thrissur town. He also got as many as 150 classrooms in 79 schools converted into high-tech classrooms.

Personal life

He was born to K. Peethambaran Kartha and C. Lekshmikutty Kunjamma on 22 November 1955. He has three siblings - two younger sisters named Sreeparvathi and Jayashree, and a younger brother named Mukundan. He is married to Prof. M. K. Vijayam and they have two children, Dr Lakshmi Devi and Jayakrishnan. Prof. C. Raveendranath was active in Kerala Shastra Sahithya Parishad and AKPCTA during his academic life.

Career

He has a master's degree in Science and was a Chemistry professor in St. Thomas College, Thrissur. He is an active worker of the CPI(M), Area Committee Member and  the Kerala Sastra Sahithya Parishad.

Books

He has written three books
 Niyamasabhaprasangangal (നിയമസഭാപ്രസംഗങ്ങൾ)
 Navalibaral athava Drurithangalude Nayam (നവലിബറൽ അഥവാ ദുരിതങ്ങളുടെ നയം)
 ASEAN Kararinte Yatharthyangal (ആസിയാൻകരാറിന്റെ യാഥാർത്ഥ്യങ്ങൾ)

References

Communist Party of India (Marxist) politicians from Kerala
Malayali politicians
Politicians from Thrissur
Living people
Kerala MLAs 2006–2011
Kerala MLAs 2016–2021
1955 births